Willy Julius Reske (September 25, 1897 – September 17, 1991) was a noted organist and composer. He wrote the music to several LDS hymns, two of which are in the current edition of the hymn book of the Church of Jesus Christ of Latter-day Saints (LDS Church).

Biography
Reske was born in Königsberg, East Prussia. His parents were Julius Reske and Louise Schmidtke. Reske joined the LDS Church in 1922 in Germany. He married Martha Louise Wiemer in 1923. In 1926 Reske emigrated to Brooklyn, New York. Reske died in Fultonville, New York.

Career
Reske played the organ at German Evangelical Lutheran Church of St. Paul's for 33 years. He composed hundreds of hymns and organ pieces.

Works
Reske wrote the music to the following hymns in the 1985 English edition of the Latter-day Saint hymnal:

"Thy Servants Are Prepared" (nos. 261, 329)
"God's Daily Care" (no. 306)

Notes

External links

1897 births
1991 deaths
German classical organists
German male organists
German Latter Day Saint hymnwriters
German Latter Day Saints
American Latter Day Saint hymnwriters
Converts to Mormonism
German emigrants to the United States
Musicians from Königsberg
Musicians from Brooklyn
People from Fultonville, New York
20th-century American musicians
20th-century German musicians
Songwriters from New York (state)
Latter Day Saints from New York (state)
20th-century organists
20th-century American male musicians
American male songwriters
Male classical organists